Lawrence Block (born June 24, 1938) is an American crime writer best known for two long-running New York-set series about the recovering alcoholic P.I. Matthew Scudder and the gentleman burglar Bernie Rhodenbarr. Block was named a Grand Master by the Mystery Writers of America in 1994.

Early life
Lawrence Block was born June 24, 1938 in Buffalo, New York, where he was raised. He attended Antioch College in Yellow Springs, Ohio, but left before graduating.

Career
Block's earliest work, published pseudonymously in the 1950s, was mostly in the soft-porn mass market paperback industry, an apprenticeship he shared with fellow mystery author Donald E. Westlake. Block describes the early sex novels as a valuable experience, noting that despite the titillating content of the books (rather mild by later standards of adult fiction) he was expected to write fully developed novels with plausible plots, characters and conflicts. He further credits the softcore novels as a factor in his prolific output; writing 15 to 20 sex novels per year to support himself financially, Block was forced to learn to write in a manner that required little revision and editing of his first drafts. His first novel was a lesbian fiction titled Strange Are The Ways of Love, written under the name Lesley Evans. In 2016, Block reissued this novel with a new title Shadows, under another of his pseudonyms, Jill Emerson.

The first of his work to appear under his own name was the 1957 story "You Can't Lose," for the crime/adventure magazine Manhunt. The first novel to be published under Block's name was Grifter's Game (1961). It started as an erotic novel but, as Block would later write, "I decided it might be a cut above what I'd been writing, so I wrote it as a crime novel with the hope it might work for Gold Medal." He has since published more than fifty novels and more than a hundred short stories, as well as a series of books for writers.

Block has lived in New York City for decades, setting most of his fiction there, and has come to be very closely associated with the city. He is married to Lynne Block. He has three daughters, Amy Reichel, Jill Block and Alison Pouliot, from an earlier marriage. With Lynne, he spends much of his time traveling (the two have been to 135 countries), but continues to consider New York his home.

He was a regular guest on The Late Late Show with Craig Ferguson (2005-2015), appearing in eight of Ferguson's ten seasons as host of the program.

Considerable autobiographical information on the earlier phase of his life and career may be found scattered through Telling Lies for Fun and Profit (1981), a collection of his fiction columns from Writer's Digest.

In 2005 he was honored with the Gumshoe Lifetime Achievement Award.

Block is an alumnus of the Ragdale Foundation.

Recurring characters

Matthew Scudder

Block's most famous creation, the ever-evolving Matthew Scudder, was introduced in 1976's The Sins of the Fathers as an alcoholic ex-cop working as an unlicensed private investigator in Hell's Kitchen. Originally published as paperbacks, the early novels are in many ways interchangeable; the second and third entries—In the Midst of Death (1976) and Time to Murder and Create (1977)—were written in the opposite order from their publication dates. 1982's 8 Million Ways to Die (filmed in 1986 by Hal Ashby, with unpopular results) breaks from that trend, concluding with Scudder introducing himself at an Alcoholics Anonymous meeting. The series was set to end on that note, but an idle promise Block had made to supply an editor friend with an original Scudder short resulted in "By the Dawn's Early Light", a story set during the character's drinking days, but told from the perspective of a recovering alcoholic. Block expanded on that with 1986's When the Sacred Ginmill Closes (named for a line in a song by folk singer Dave Van Ronk, a close friend), which proved not only one of the more literary entries, but also a favorite of the author and his fans. From then on, Scudder's circumstances rarely remain the same from one book to the next; 1990's A Ticket to the Boneyard, for example, reunites him with Elaine Mardell, a hooker from his days on the force, whom he marries several books later. Other fan favorites are 1991's taut, gruesome A Dance at the Slaughterhouse (winner of the Edgar Award for Best [mystery] Novel), and 1993's A Long Line of Dead Men, a tightly plotted puzzler featuring a rapidly dwindling fraternity known as the "Club of 31".  A Walk Among the Tombstones, published in 1992, was made into a film, released in 2014, written and directed by Scott Frank, with Liam Neeson playing the lead role. The seventeenth entry, A Drop of the Hard Stuff was published in May 2011.

It has been suggested that Scudder's struggle with alcoholism is in part autobiographical; while Block has repeatedly refused to discuss the subject, citing AA's own tradition of anonymity, in a column he wrote for Writer's Digest, Block wrote that when he created Scudder, "I let him hang out in the same saloon where I spent a great deal of my own time. I was drinking pretty heavily around that time, and I made him a pretty heavy drinker, too. I drank whiskey, sometimes mixing it with coffee. So did Scudder."

Bernie Rhodenbarr

Block's other major series, humorous and much lighter in tone, relates the misadventures of gentleman burglar Bernie Rhodenbarr. The series is rich in sophisticated, witty dialogue.

Unlike Scudder, Rhodenbarr is ageless, remaining essentially the same from 1977's Burglars Can't Be Choosers, to the eleventh and most recent entry, 2013's The Burglar Who Counted the Spoons. The only significant advancements come in the third volume, The Burglar Who Liked to Quote Kipling (1979, winner of the first annual Nero Award) which sees Bernie having used the spoils from his previous caper to buy a bookstore, and introduces Carolyn Kaiser, his lesbian "soulmate" and partner in crime. The plots run very much to form: Bernie breaks into a residence (usually on Manhattan's Upper East Side) and, through a series of implausible events, becomes involved in a murder investigation—often as the prime suspect. Not even an eleven-year hiatus (between 1983's The Burglar Who Painted Like Mondrian and 1994's The Burglar Who Traded Ted Williams) would see that basic formula change. There is, however, a meta quality to the more recent entries: Bernie, the reluctant detective, is himself a bookseller and genre fan, and is apt to make references to Agatha Christie, E.W. Hornung (his cat is named "Raffles"), Dashiell Hammett, Raymond Chandler, Sue Grafton and John Sandford, among others. The Burglar Who Thought He Was Bogart (1995) exploits this to full effect: set during a Humphrey Bogart film festival, the story is itself inspired by many of the actor's most famous roles. The Burglar in the Library (1997) similarly imagines a meeting between Hammett and Chandler at a New England inn in the 1940s, casting a volume inscribed by Chandler to Hammett as its own Maltese Falcon. In The Burglar in the Rye, Bernie helps track down a writer clearly based on J.D. Salinger.

The second novel, The Burglar in The Closet, was filmed in 1987 as Burglar, with Whoopi Goldberg as Bernie (or Bernice).

Evan Michael Tanner

Besides Scudder and Rhodenbarr, Block has written eight novels about Evan Tanner, an adventurer and accidental revolutionary who, as a result of an injury sustained in the Korean War, cannot sleep. All but the last of these were published in the 1960s and early 1970s (beginning with 1966's The Thief Who Couldn't Sleep), while the most recent, 1998's Tanner on Ice, revived the character after nearly a thirty-year hiatus.

Chip Harrison
Chip Harrison, running on the twin engines of lust and curiosity, originally appeared in two funny, non-mystery novels which revolved around seventeen-year-old Chip's obsessive quest to lose his virginity: No Score and Chip Harrison Scores Again.

Realizing the series didn't have much of a future once Chip reached his goal, Block puts Chip to work as an assistant to Leo Haig, an admirer of sleuth Nero Wolfe who models himself after his hero (e.g., Wolfe raises tropical flowers, Haig raises tropical fish). They appeared in two subsequent, decidedly tongue-in-cheek mystery novels: Make Out With Murder and The Topless Tulip Caper, and a handful of short stories.

Keller

Four episodic novels (Hit Man (1998), Hit List (2000), Hit Parade (2006) and Hit Me (2013)) as well as one full-length novel (Hit and Run (2008)) chronicle the life of Keller, a lonely, wistful hitman who originally appeared as a semi-regular feature in Playboy magazine in the 1990s. Most of the novels are fix-ups of related short stories; Hit and Run is the only Keller novel conceived of and written as a single story.  In 2016, a new novella was published, Keller's Fedora, in which Keller is persuaded to come out of retirement for one last job.

Keller's full name is John Paul Keller (a fact mentioned in Hit Man), although he is rarely called anything but Keller in the series. The stories are rarely action-oriented or focused on the details of his crimes, instead being character studies of Keller's personality and the people he meets (e.g., Keller's being hired to kill a major league baseball designated hitter but postponing the act and following the team to away games so the hitter can reach the career milestone of 400 home runs). Originally based in New York City, after a disastrous hit gone wrong he later relocates to New Orleans where he lives under the name "Nicholas Edwards" and marries, has a child and works in construction.  Keller receives assignments via a contact named Dot, who is originally based in White Plains.  His assignments usually take him to different cities, where he often envisions himself retiring from the business, daydreaming about settling there, before finishing off the assignment and returning, his fantasies forgotten as a passing dream. Keller's pastime is stamp collecting, to which he is nearly obsessively devoted.  He collects non-U.S. issues, prior to 1940, with a particular interest in stamps from former colonies of the French Empire.

Hit and Run was nominated for the CWA Gold Dagger at the 2009 Crime Thriller Awards.

Other works
Small Town (2003), Block's first non-series book in fifteen years, details a group of New Yorkers' varying responses to the terrorist attacks of September 11, 2001. Block has also written dozens of short stories over the years, and he is the only four-time winner of the Edgar Award for Best Short Story.  The 2002 collection Enough Rope compiles stories, 84 in all, from earlier collections, such as Like a Lamb to Slaughter and Sometimes They Bite, along with new and previously uncollected stories.

Block describes series character Martin H. Ehrengraf as a dapper little criminal defense lawyer whose clients all turn out to be innocent. Ehrengraf charges a mere $1 retainer fee and afterwards works on contingency; he gets paid a massive fee if and only if his clients are cleared of wrongdoing. When his clients are cleared, it's because Ehrengraf has committed misdeeds up to and including murder to exonerate his client and often frame another for the crimes. The first short story featuring Ehrengraf, "The Ehrengraf Defense," was published in Ellery Queen's Mystery Magazine in 1978. By 2003, twelve stories had been published and in 2012 Block completed an eleventh story, "The Ehrengraf Settlement." All eleven were collected and published in an eVolume, Ehrengraf For The Defense (2012).

In addition to writing the scripts for a handful of television episodes over the years—including, in 2005, two episodes of the ESPN series Tilt—Block co-wrote the screenplay for My Blueberry Nights, a 2007 film directed by Wong Kar-wai and starring Norah Jones.

Selected bibliography

Matthew Scudder novels
The Sins of the Fathers (1976)
Time to Murder and Create (1976)
In the Midst of Death (1976)
A Stab in the Dark (1981)
Eight Million Ways to Die (1982)
When the Sacred Ginmill Closes (1986)
Out on the Cutting Edge (1989)
A Ticket to the Boneyard (1990)
A Dance at the Slaughterhouse (1991)
A Walk Among the Tombstones (1992)
The Devil Knows You're Dead (1993)
A Long Line of Dead Men (1994)
Even the Wicked (1997)
Everybody Dies (1998)
Hope to Die (2001)
All the Flowers Are Dying (2005)
A Drop of the Hard Stuff  (2011)
The Night and the Music  (2013) (A collection of Matthew Scudder short stories and novelettes, 11 in total)
A Time to Scatter Stones  (2019) (Novella)

Bernie Rhodenbarr novels
Burglars Can't Be Choosers (1977)
The Burglar in the Closet (1978)
The Burglar Who Liked to Quote Kipling (1979)
The Burglar Who Studied Spinoza (1980)
The Burglar Who Painted Like Mondrian (1983)
The Burglar Who Traded Ted Williams (1994)
The Burglar Who Thought He Was Bogart (1995)
The Burglar in the Library (1997)
The Burglar in the Rye (1999)
The Burglar on the Prowl (2004)
The Burglar Who Counted the Spoons (2013)
The Burglar in Short Order (2020)
The Burglar who Met Fredric Brown (2022)
There are also three Bernie Rhodenbarr short stories: "Like a Thief in the Night" (Cosmopolitan, May 1983), "The Burglar Who Dropped In On Elvis" (Playboy, April 1990), and "The Burglar Who Smelled Smoke" (Mary Higgins Clark Mystery Magazine, Summer/Fall 1997). These stories are collected in the 2002 anthology Enough Rope, and in the Rhodenbarr book, The Burglar in Short Order.

Evan Tanner novels
The Thief Who Couldn't Sleep (1966)
The Canceled Czech (1966)
Tanner's Twelve Swingers (1967)
The Scoreless Thai (also known as Two for Tanner; 1968)
Tanner's Tiger (1968)
Here Comes a Hero (also known as Tanner's Virgin; 1968)
Me Tanner, You Jane (1970)
Tanner on Ice (1998)

Chip Harrison novels/stories (as Chip Harrison)
No Score (1970)
Chip Harrison Scores Again (1971)
Make Out With Murder (a.k.a. The Five Little Rich Girls) (1974)
The Topless Tulip Caper (1975)
"As Dark As Christmas Gets" (1997), a Chip Harrison short story written specifically for customers of the Otto Penzler–owned Mysterious Bookshop; printed in booklet format for the 1997 holiday season, and collected in Christmas at The Mysterious Bookshop (Vanguard Press 2010)
A collection of eighty-four short stories, Enough Rope (2002), contains two Chip Harrison stories.

Keller novels
Hit Man (1998)
Hit List (2000)
Hit Parade (2006)
Hit and Run (2008)
Hit Me (2013)
Keller's Fedora (2016) (Novella)
A collection of eighty-four short stories, Enough Rope (2002), contains five Keller stories.

Written as Jill Emerson
Warm and Willing (1964)
Enough of Sorrow (1965) 
Thirty (1970) 
Threesome (1970) 
A Madwoman's Diary (1972)  
The Trouble with Eden (1973)
A Week as Andrea Benstock (1975) 
Getting Off (2011)
Shadows (2016)

Written as Paul Kavanagh
Such Men Are Dangerous (1969)
The Triumph of Evil (1971)
Not Comin' Home to You (1974)

Written as Sheldon Lord
Carla (Midwood Books, 1958)
Born to Be Bad (Tower Publications, 1959)
69 Barrow Street (Tower Publications, 1959)
A Strange Kind of Love (Tower Publications, 1960)
Of Shame and Joy: An Original Novel (Midwood Books, 1960)
A Woman Must Love (Tower Publications, 1960)
Kept Midwood 035 (Tower Publications, 1960)
Candy (Tower Publications, 1960)
21 Gay Street: An Original Novel (Tower Publications, 1960)
April North (Beacon Books, 1961)
Pads are for Passion (Beacon Books, 1961) (reissued by Hard Case Crime as A Diet of Treacle)
Community of Women (Beacon Books, 1963) 
The Sex Shuffle (Beacon Books, 1964) (reissued by Hard Case Crime as Lucky at Cards)
Savage Lover (Softcover Library, 1968) (written in 1958; reissued by Hard Case Crime as Sinner Man)

Written as Andrew Shaw

Campus Tramp (Nightstand Books, 1959)
The Adulterers (Corinth Publications, 1960)
High School Sex Club (Nightstand Books, 1960)
College for Sinners (Corinth Publications, 1960)
 Sexpot! (Nightstand Books, 1960)
The Twisted Ones (Nightstand Books, 1961)
$20 Lust (Corinth Publications, 1961) (reissued as Cinderella Sims by Greenleaf Classics)
Gutter Girl (Bedstand Books, 1961)
Lover (Nightstand Books, 1961) (reissued as Gigolo Johnny Wells)
Sin Devil (Nightstand Books, 1961)
Four Lives at the Crossroads (1962)

Written as Don Holliday
Circle of Sinners (1961) - in collaboration with Hal Dresner
Border Lust (1962) (reissued by Hard Case Crime as Borderline)

Written as Lesley Evans
Strange are the Ways of Love (1959)

Written as Lee Duncan
Fidel Castro Assassinated (1961) (reissued by Hard Case Crime as Killing Castro)

Written as Anne Campbell Clark
Passport to Peril (1967)

Written as Ben Christopher
Strange Embrace (1962) - written as a tie-in to TV series Johnny Midnight

In collaboration with Donald E. Westlake
A Girl Called Honey (Midwood Books, 1960, credited to Sheldon Lord and Alan Marshall) 
So Willing (Midwood Books, 1960, credited to Sheldon Lord and Alan Marshall)
Sin Hellcat (Nightstand Books, 1961, credited to Andrew Shaw)

Other fiction
Strange Are The Ways of Love (1958), as Lesley Evans (reissued in 2016 as Shadows, by Jill Emerson)
Babe in the Woods (1960) - Block ghostwrote this novel following the death of author William Ard (only Ard is credited)
Death Pulls a Doublecross (1961) (reissued as Coward's Kiss)
Mona (1961) (reissued as Sweet Slow Death and by Hard Case Crime as Grifter's Game)
Markham (1961) (reissued as You Could Call It Murder) - written and published as a tie-in to TV series Markham
The Girl with the Long Green Heart (1965)
Deadly Honeymoon (1967)
After the First Death (1969)
The Specialists (1969)
Ronald Rabbit Is a Dirty Old Man (1971)
Ariel (1980)
Code of Arms (1981)
Into the Night (1987) - Block completed this novel from a manuscript by Cornell Woolrich
Random Walk (1988)
Small Town (2003)
The Girl With the Deep Blue Eyes (2015)
Dead Girl Blues (2020)

Short stories
Some Days You Get the Bear: Collected Stories (1994)
Enough Rope: Collected Stories (2002)
One Night Stands and Lost Weekends (2009)
Dolly's Trash and Treasures (written for audio presentation in The Sounds of Crime) (2010)
The Night and the Music (2011)
Ehrengraf for the Defense (2012)
Catch and Release (2013)
I Know How To Pick Em (2013) (short story in anthology Dangerous Women) (2013)
Dark City Lights: New York Stories (2015)

Screenplay
My Blueberry Nights (2007, co-written with Wong Kar-wai)

Books for writers
Writing the Novel From Plot to Print (1979)
Telling Lies for Fun & Profit (1981) [a collection of his slightly re-edited fiction how-to column from Writer's Digest]
Write For Your Life (1986)
Spider, Spin Me a Web (1987)
The Liar's Bible (2011)
The Liar's Companion (2011)
Afterthoughts (2011)
Writing the Novel From Plot to Print to Pixel (2016)

Memoirs
Step by Step: A Pedestrian Memoir (2009)
A Writer Prepares (2021)

Awards and nominations
Wins are in bold.

Anthony Awards
 1987, Best Novel, When the Sacred Ginmill Closes
 1991, Best Novel, A Ticket to the Boneyard
 1994, Best Short Story Collection, Some Days You Get the Bear
 2001, Best Short Story Collection, Master's Choice II

Edgar Awards
 1978, Best Paperback Original, Time to Murder and Create
 1983, Best Novel, Eight Million Ways to Die
 1985, Best Short Story, "By Dawn's Early Light"
 1991, Best Short Story, "Answers to Soldier"
 1992, Best Novel, A Dance at the Slaughterhouse
 Best Short Story, "A Blow For Freedom"
 1994, Grand Master Award
 Best Short Story, "Keller's Therapy"
 1995, Best Novel, A Long Line of Dead Men
 1998, Best Short Story, "Keller On the Spot"
 1999, Best Short Story, "Looking for David"
 2017, Best Short Story, "Autumn at the Automat"

Shamus Awards
 1982, Best Novel, A Stab in the Dark
 1983, Best Novel, Eight Million Ways to Die
 1985, Best Short Story, "By the Dawn's Early Light"
 1987, Best Novel, When the Sacred Ginmill Closes
 1990, Best Novel, Out on the Cutting Edge
 1991, Best Novel, A Ticket to the Boneyard
 1992, Best Novel, Dance at the Slaughterhouse
 1994, Best Novel, The Devil Knows You're Dead
 Best Short Story, "The Merciful Angel of Death"
 1995, Best Novel, A Long Line of Dead Men
 2002, Lifetime Achievement Award ("The Eye")
 2009, Best Character Award ("The Hammer") for Matt Scudder

References

External links

Modern Signed Books BlogTalkRadio Interview with Rodger Nichols February 2016

1938 births
Living people
20th-century American novelists
20th-century American male writers
21st-century American novelists
American mystery writers
American detective fiction writers
American crime fiction writers
Anthony Award winners
Antioch College alumni
Writers of books about writing fiction
Cartier Diamond Dagger winners
Edgar Award winners
Maltese Falcon Award winners
Writers from Buffalo, New York
People from New York City
Shamus Award winners
American male novelists
American erotica writers
American male short story writers
20th-century American short story writers
21st-century American short story writers
21st-century American male writers
Novelists from New York (state)
American philatelists